Gyula Szepes (18 August 1899 – 2 March 1985) was a Hungarian cross-country skier. He competed in the men's 18 kilometre event at the 1928 Winter Olympics.

References

External links
 

1899 births
1985 deaths
Hungarian male cross-country skiers
Hungarian male Nordic combined skiers
Olympic cross-country skiers of Hungary
Olympic Nordic combined skiers of Hungary
Cross-country skiers at the 1928 Winter Olympics
Nordic combined skiers at the 1928 Winter Olympics
Sportspeople from Spišská Nová Ves